{{Infobox person
| name               = Erana James
| image              = 
| caption            = 
| birth_name         = Erana James
| birth_date         = 
| birth_place        = Whangarei, New Zealand
| occupation         = Actress
| known_for          = The WildsThe Changeover|
}}

Erana James is an actress from New Zealand. She is best known for her role as Toni Shalifoe in The Wilds''.

Early life 
Erana James was born to  Māori parents in Whangārei, New Zealand where she grew up on a farm. She lived there with her family before moving to Wellington at the age of 10.

Filmography

References 

Living people
New Zealand film actresses
New Zealand Māori actresses
New Zealand television actresses
People from Whangārei
Year of birth missing (living people)
Ngāti Whātua people